Take Command Console (TCC), formerly known as 4DOS for Windows NT (4NT), is a command-line interpreter by JP Software, designed as a substitute for the default command interpreter in Microsoft Windows, CMD.EXE.

Take Command was the name that JP Software used for their GUI command-line interpreters for Windows 3.1 (TC16), Windows 32-bit (TC32) and later OS/2 Presentation Manager (TCOS2).  These were released concurrently with version 4DOS 5.5, 4NT 2.5 and 4OS2 2.52.  The OS/2 and Windows 16-bit survived until version 2.02, they are still available for download from the FTP site on JP Software.

History
TCC is based on the earlier 4DOS command shell for DOS, and 4OS2 for OS/2.

Beginning with version 12 of 4NT, support for Windows 95, 98, ME, NT and 2000 were removed. Beginning with version 16 of TCC, support for Windows XP was removed, although it might still run in XP. 4NT was renamed to Take Command Console as part of JP Software's Take Command version 9. Beginning with version 9, the name Take Command was applied to an entirely different assembly of products: TCI (Tabbed Command Interface) and 4NT.  The original Take Command is no longer being developed.  TCI was expanded to include a file manager and various other windows, while 4NT was renamed TCC, and issued in "light" form.

Features
TCC provides a rich set of command line and batch programming capabilities. It can work in conjunction with other scripting languages, such as REXX, Ruby and Perl, or Windows Scripting languages, in the form of Active Scripting engines such as VBScript and JScript as well as PerlScript (via ActivePerl), TclScript (via ActiveTcl), PythonScript (via ActivePython), and the scripting engine version of Object REXX to provide greater access to the operating system.

TCC features a number of enhancements when compared to 
 Additional commands
 GUI commands (msgbox, querybox, etc.)
 Extended functionality of existing commands
 Extended batch file processing facilities
 Support for command aliases, also in scripts
 Enhanced wildcards and the ability to filter by file sizes, date and time stamps, etcetera
 Context-specific offline or online help
 Colored directory listings
 More internal variables
 Variable functions
 Integrated development environment (IDE)
 An interactive debugger for batch files, including a built-in syntax highlighting text editor
 Configuration stored in an INI file
 Support for several internet communication protocols:
 File Transfer Protocol (FTP)
 Trivial File Transfer Protocol (TFTP)
 FTPS (FTP Secure)
 HTTP
 HTTPS
 Jabber instant messaging
 Support for plugins to provide custom functionality
 Multiple command shells in tabbed windows

Take Command
Take Command is a command-line interpreter for the Microsoft Windows line of operating systems. Its advantages over the regular command shell are analogous to those of 4DOS over the COMMAND.COM supplied with MS-DOS. 

Beginning with version 9, Tabbed Console Interface and 4NT have been merged into the Take Command product line. 4NT was renamed to Take Command Console, with a Lite Edition (TCC/LE) released as freeware. Take Command includes a tabbed interface, configurable toolbars, and an integrated graphical file explorer. Take Command adds a built-in batch file editor and debugger, FTP and HTTP file access in commands, network file system access, Active Scripting integration, system monitoring commands, and Windows service controls.

Features of note include:
 Command aliases
 Command-line completion
 Command history
 File globbing / Wildcards
 Redirection and piping
 Direct access to FTP, TFTP and HTTP
 Context-specific online help
 Colored directory listings
 Variable functions
 Fully customizable

See also
 Comparison of command shells

References

External links
JP Software
4DOS.INFO – Klaus Meinhard's 4DOS support site with many batch examples, related docs and programs
comp.os.msdos.4dos – Usenet group covering 4DOS and other JP Software shells; also accessible via Google Groups

Windows command shells
Scripting languages
Windows-only software